Taranto Cathedral is a Roman Catholic cathedral in Taranto, Apulia, Italy, dedicated to Saint Catald. It is the archiepiscopal seat of the Archdiocese of Taranto.

References

Cathedrals in Apulia
Churches in the province of Taranto
Taranto
Roman Catholic cathedrals in Italy